Maik may refer to

52005 Maik, a main-belt asteroid
MAIK Nauka/Interperiodica, a Russian academic publisher

People with the given name
Maik Außendorf (born 1971), German politician
Maik Baier (born 1989), German racing cyclist 
Maik Beermann (born 1981), German politician
Maik Baumgarten (born 1993), German football player 
Maik Bullmann (born 1967), German Greco-Roman wrestler
Maik Eckhardt (born 1970), German sport shooter
Maik Franz (born 1981), German football player
Maik Galakos (born 1951), Greek football player
Maik Hamburger (1931–2020), German translator, writer
Maik Heydeck (born 1965), German boxer
Maik Hosang (born 1961), German philosopher
Maik Kegel (born 1989), German football player 
Maik Kischko (born 1966), German football player
Maik Klingenberg, Goodbye Berlin character 
Maik Kotsar (born 1996), Estonian basketball player
Maik Kuivenhoven (born 1988), Dutch darts player 
Maik Krahberg (born 1971), German artistic gymnast
Maik Landsmann (born 1967), German track cyclist
Maik Langendorf (born 1972), German-Austrian darts player
Maik Łukowicz (born 1995), Polish football payer
Maik Naumenko (1955–1991), Soviet rock musician, singer
Maik Nawrocki (born 2001), Polish football player
Maik Nill (born 1963), German weightlifter
Maik Machulla (born 1977), German retired handball player 
Maik Odenthal (born 1992), German football player 
Maik Petzold (born 1978),  Germany athlete
Maik dos Santos (born 1989), Brazilian handball goalkeeper
Maik Schutzbach (born 1986), German football player
Maik Szarszewski (born 1972), German archer
Maik Taylor (born 1971), Northern Ireland football player
Maik Wagefeld (born 1981), German football player 
Maik Walpurgis (born 1973), German football coach 
Maik Walter (1925–2020), Polish-French football player 
Maik Zirbes (born 1990), German basketball player
Maik Yohansen (1895–1937), Ukrainian poet
Maciej Maik (1984–2003), Polish swimmer

See also
 Mike (disambiguation)

Masculine given names
German masculine given names
Polish masculine given names